Lancia Esagamma is a truck and bus chassis produced by Italian car manufacturer Lancia from 1962 to 1973.

Trucks
A total of 6,648 Esagamma trucks were built from 1962 to 1971.
The truck uses in the engine parts from aluminum. They are from 6 cylinders and had 187 to 228 hp. Lancia Esagamma can carry from 19 to 44 t (with trailer). The truck was used in Italy for commercial needs and building industry.

Lancia Esagamma was distributed for countries like: France, UK, Germany, Austria, Belgium, Greece, Netherlands, Slovenia, Iran and other countries.

Versions
516
519
520

Buses

Lancia Esatau 703
The first bus, the 703, was produced in from 1960 to 1964. It was built with bodies from Viberti, Pistoiesi and SEAT-Casaro. 
Around 220 units were built by Pistoiesi. It had engine with 150 hp.

Lancia Esatau 703-08

The Lancia Esatau 703-08, sometimes called Mauri after its coach builder, was produced from 1973 to 1980. This special four-axle articulated bus version was produced for Milan, and was the first Italian aluminium bus.

Lancia Esagamma 715
The Lancia Esagamma 715 model is a bus for transporting people over long distances. It was produced from 1965 to 1970. The bus has two doors, one in the front and one in the back, and uses a body built by Carrozzeria Bianchi. The bus has a capacity of 42 places.

Lancia Esagamma 718

The 718 were produced from 1973 to 1974, with 200 built.

Engines
197HP
207HP
209HP
228HP

References

Esagamma
Esagamma
Vehicles introduced in 1962